The Richard Berry Jr. House is located in Springfield, Kentucky, and has been on the National Register of Historic Places listing in Washington County, Kentucky since 1989.

Richard and Rachel Berry
About 1785 Richard Berry, Sr. moved to Kentucky from Virginia with his wife, Rachel Shipley. From his will proven on December 4, 1798, Richard and Rachel had seven children: "Joanna, Sarah, Rachel, Richard, Francis, Jane, [and] Edward".

The house
The 2 storied log, frame dwelling has a brick chimney, 3 bays and a gabled roof. It was originally located north of Highway 438 about 8 miles from Springfield, Kentucky in Litsey. It was the best example of a log single cell dwelling in the county.  The Beechland neighborhood was sometimes called Poortown, which actually was home to successful landowners and the small cabins of people who worked for them.

Richard Berry and his house were described as follows:
Richard Berry was well-to-do, and his double, hewn-log cabin, that fronted the road a short distance from the ford at Beech Fork, was one of the largest houses in Washington County.

Thomas and Nancy Lincoln marriage
Thomas Lincoln on June 12, 1806, married Nancy Hanks in the Richard Berry home. The day after the wedding the Lincolns enjoyed a "luxurious" infare supper of lamb, venison, bear steak, turkey, duck, and a wide range of dishes at the Richard Berry home.

Nancy, an excellent seamstress, worked for Richard Berry Jr. before her marriage. Nancy was brought to the home by her friend Polly Ewing Berry, the wife of Richard Berry Jr. Polly was a friend of Nancys from Mercer County, Kentucky and Richard Berry Jr. was a good friend of Thomas Lincoln. Nancy's marriage bond was signed by Richard Berry Jr. who identified himself as her guardian.

Francis Berry House
The Francis Berry house, or Berry House, was originally located about a mile east of its present location in the Lincoln Homestead State Park in Springfield, Kentucky. Francis Berry was a brother to another early settler, Richard Berry. It is one theory that it was this house, the Francis Berry House, where Nancy Hanks was courted by and married to Thomas Lincoln. The couple were the parents of the 16th United States President, Abraham Lincoln.

The home, originally in the Beechland section, and now in the Lincoln Homestead State Park, is furnished with "pioneer relics of the Lincoln Age."

Notes

References

Federal architecture in Kentucky
National Register of Historic Places in Washington County, Kentucky
Houses in Washington County, Kentucky
Houses on the National Register of Historic Places in Kentucky
Log buildings and structures on the National Register of Historic Places in Kentucky
Lincoln family